Eso is a populated town and is located in Orhionmwon Local Government Area in Edo State, Nigeria.

References

Populated places in Edo State